Tifty is near Turriff, Aberdeenshire, Scotland.

References

Villages in Aberdeenshire